Canary-winged parakeet is a common name for two closely related parakeet species in the genus, Brotogeris, both native to the Amazon Basin in South America. These are:

Brotogeris chiriri, the yellow-chevroned parakeet
Brotogeris versicolurus, the white-winged parakeet

Birds by common name